Marcin Dylla is a Polish classical guitarist who has won over fifteen international classical guitar competitions.

He was born in Chorzów, Poland, and took lessons at the Ruda Śląska Music High School, attended the Academy of Music in Katowice, and academies in Basel, Freiburg, and Maastricht. His teachers included Oscar Ghiglia, Carlo Marchione, and Sonja Prunnbauer.

In 2007, he won the gold medal at the international hosted by the Guitar Foundation of America in Los Angeles, California.

Awards and honors
He won first place in the following international guitar competitions:
 1996 Edmund Jurkowski memorial, Tychy (Poland)
 1997 Tredrez-Locquemeau (France)
 1998 Karl Scheit, Vienna (Austria)
 1999 Liechtenstein
 2000 Alhambra International Guitar Competition, Valencia (Spain)
 2000 Concorso Internazionale di Chitarra di Gargano, Gargnano (Italy)
 2001 Forum Gitarre, Vienna (Austria)
 2001 Sernancelhe (Portugal)
 2001 Michele Pittaluga International Classical Guitar Competition, Alassandria (Italy)
 2002 Joaquin Rodrigo, Madrid (Spain)
 2000 Almeria (Spain)
 2002 Crete (Greece)
 2002 H.R.H. Princess Cristina, Madrid (Spain)
 2003 Markneukirchen (Germany)
 2003 Rene Bartoli, Aix-en-Provence (France)
 2004 JoAnn Falletta International Guitar Concerto Competition, Buffalo, New York
 2004 Printemps de la Guitare, Charleroi 
 2006 Aranda de Duero (Spain)
 2007 Guitar Foundation of America, Los Angeles, California

See also
 Michele Pittaluga International Classical Guitar Competition
 JoAnn Falletta International Guitar Concerto Competition

References

External links 
 

1976 births
Living people
Maastricht Academy of Music alumni
People from Chorzów
Polish classical guitarists
Polish guitarists
Polish musicians
21st-century guitarists